Saeed Al Mowalad (born 9 March 1991) is a Saudi professional footballer who currently plays as a right back for Al-Ettifaq and the Saudi Arabia national team.

In May 2018 he was named in Saudi Arabia’s preliminary squad for the 2018 World Cup in Russia.

Career statistics

International
Statistics accurate as of match played 12 October 2018.

Honours

Club 
Al-Ahli
Runner-up
 AFC Champions League: 2012
 King Cup of Champions: 2014

References

External links 
 

1991 births
Living people
Saudi Arabian footballers
Saudi Arabian expatriate footballers
Saudi Arabia youth international footballers
Saudi Arabia international footballers
Al-Ahli Saudi FC players
S.C. Farense players
Al-Raed FC players
Ettifaq FC players
Saudi Professional League players
Liga Portugal 2 players
Saudi Arabian expatriate sportspeople in Portugal
Expatriate footballers in Portugal
Association football fullbacks
2015 AFC Asian Cup players
Sportspeople from Jeddah